GIX or Gix may refer to:
 George Von Elm (1901–1961), American golfer
 Ghana Internet Exchange
 Gilima language